Club Deportivo Real Comayagua was a Honduran football club based in Comayagua, Honduras.

History
Real Maya bought Real Comayagua's franchise for the 2002–03 season.

Achievements
Segunda División
Runners-up (1): 2000–01

League performance

All-time record vs. opponents
 As of 2001–02 Clausura

References

Defunct football clubs in Honduras
Comayagua
Association football clubs disestablished in 2002